The Sixteenth Wisconsin Legislature convened from January 14, 1863, to April 2, 1863, in regular session.

Senators representing odd-numbered districts were newly elected for this session and were serving the first year of a two-year term. Assembly members were elected to a one-year term. Assembly members and even-numbered senators were elected in the general election of November 4, 1862. Senators representing even-numbered districts were serving the second year of their two-year term, having been elected in the general election held on November 5, 1861.

Major events
 January 1, 1863: U.S. President Abraham Lincoln's Emancipation Proclamation went into effect.
 April 30–May 8, 1863: Battle of Chancellorsville took place in Spotsylvania County, Virginia.  Six regiments of Wisconsin Volunteers participated in the battle.  
 May 18–July 4, 1863: Siege of Vicksburg took place in Warren County, Mississippi.  Seventeen regiments of Wisconsin Volunteers participated in the siege.
 July 1–3, 1863: Battle of Gettysburg took place near Gettysburg, Pennsylvania. Six regiments of Wisconsin Volunteers participated in the battle.  Future-Governor of Wisconsin Lucius Fairchild and future State Treasurer Henry Baetz were wounded.
 November 3, 1863: James T. Lewis elected Governor of Wisconsin.

Major legislation
 March 13, 1863: Joint Resolution recommending Colonels J. C. Starkweather and Geo. E. Bryant to promotion, 1863 Joint Resolution 2
 March 25, 1863: Joint Resolution relative to adopting state flag, 1863 Joint Resolution 4
 March 26, 1863: Act to provide for continuing the work on the state capitol, 1863 Act 107
 March 28, 1863: Act to authorize the borrowing of money to repel invasion, suppress insurrection and defend the state in time of war, 1863 Act 157
 April 1, 1863: Act authorizing the governor to take care of the sick and wounded soldiers of the Wisconsin volunteers, and appropriating money out of the treasury for that purpose, 1863 Act 196
 April 1, 1863: Act to provide for compensating parties whose property may be injured or destroyed in consequence of mobs or riots, 1863 Act 211
 April 1, 1863: Act to provide for the enrollment of persons liable to perform military duty, and the organization of the state militia for active service, 1863 Act 242
 April 2, 1863: Act to provide for the relief of families of persons who may die in the military service of the United States or of the state of Wisconsin, 1863 Act 264

Party summary

Senate summary

Assembly summary

Sessions
 1st Regular session: January 14, 1863 – April 2, 1863

Leaders

Senate leadership
 President of the Senate: Vacant
 President pro tempore: Wyman Spooner

Assembly leadership
 Speaker of the Assembly: J. Allen Barber

Members

Members of the Senate
Members of the Wisconsin Senate for the Sixteenth Wisconsin Legislature:

Members of the Assembly
Members of the Assembly for the Sixteenth Wisconsin Legislature:

Employees

Senate employees
 Chief Clerk: Frank M. Stewart
 Assistant Clerk: J. M. Randall
 Engrossing Clerk: G. W. Campbell
 Enrolling Clerk: George W. Stoner
 Transcribing Clerk: J. J. Tschudy
 Sergeant-at-Arms: Luther Basford
 Assistant Sergeant-at-Arms: James L. Wilder
 Postmaster: James L. Hosford
 Assistant Postmaster: John Van t'Woud
 Doorkeeper: B. S. Miller
 Assistant Doorkeeper: Francis Mika
 Assistant Doorkeeper: Samuel Bachman
 Assistant Doorkeeper: Paul Halverson
 Firemen:
 Alex Stilwell
 John Crowley 
 Messengers:
 J. E. Brown
 John Hutchins
 Albert F. Dexter
 Frank Kellogg
 Porter: George E. Albee

Assembly employees
 Chief Clerk: John S. Dean
 Assistant Clerk: Ephraim W. Young
 Bookkeeper: Merrick P. Wing
 Engrossing Clerk: Herbert A. Lewis
 Enrolling Clerk: S. Canning Fisher
 Transcribing Clerk: Henry C. Hadley
 Sergeant-at-Arms: A. M. Thomson
 1st Assistant Sergeant-at-Arms: C. D. Lon
 2nd Assistant Sergeant-at-Arms: D. S. Hawley
 Postmaster: M. B. Patchin
 1st Assistant Postmaster: John B. Eugene
 2nd Assistant Postmaster: Oscar Babcock
 Doorkeeper: Franklin Kelly
 Assistant Doorkeeper: A. J. Fuller
 Assistant Doorkeeper: P. P. Davis
 Assistant Doorkeeper: William C. Lesure
 Firemen:
 H. H. Hayward
 Philip Carey
 Iver Knudsen
 Messengers:
 Adam Waltz
 James E. Dean
 Richard L. Hayward
 Edgar C. McLaughlin
 Patrick W. Lannen
 William H. Miller
 Louis Sholes
 George D. Potter
 Mark W. Bailey

References

Notes

External links

1863 in Wisconsin
Wisconsin
Wisconsin legislative sessions